Historical particularism (coined by Marvin Harris in 1968) is widely considered the first American anthropological school of thought.

Closely associated with Franz Boas and the Boasian approach to anthropology, historical particularism rejected the cultural evolutionary model that had dominated anthropology until Boas. It argued that each society is a collective representation of its unique historical past. Boas rejected parallel evolutionism, the idea that all societies are on the same path and have reached their specific level of development the same way all other societies have.  Instead, historical particularism showed that societies could reach the same level of cultural development through different paths.

Boas suggested that diffusion, trade, corresponding environment, and historical accident may create similar cultural traits.  Three traits, as suggested by Boas, are used to explain cultural customs: environmental conditions, psychological factors, and historical connections, history being the most important (hence the school's name).

Critics of historical particularism argue that it is anti-theoretical because it doesn't seek to make universal theories, applicable to all the world's cultures.  Boas believed that theories would arise spontaneously once enough data was collected.  This school of anthropological thought was the first to be uniquely American and Boas (his school of thought included) was, arguably, the most influential anthropological thinker in American history.

References

Further reading

 
 
 
 

Anthropology